The regnal years of English monarchs are the official regnal years of the monarchs of the Kingdom of England from 1066, the Kingdom of Great Britain from May 1707 to January 1801, and the United Kingdom since January 1801. The regnal calendar ("nth year of the reign of King X", abbreviated to "n X", etc.) continues to be used in many official British government and legal documents of historical interest, notably parliamentary statutes.

Overview 
For centuries, English official public documents have been dated according to the regnal years of the ruling monarch. Traditionally, parliamentary statutes are referenced by regnal year, e.g. the Occasional Conformity Act 1711 is officially referenced as "10 Anne c. 6" (read as "the sixth chapter of the statute of the parliamentary session that sat in the 10th year of the reign of Queen Anne"). In the event of a second session, or a second Parliament, in the same regnal year the chapter numbering would reset. As a result, either an "s. 2" or "sess. 2" to indicate the second session, or an "Stat. 2" to indicate a second Parliament would be added. For example, the Queen Regent's Prerogative Act 1554 is cited as "1 Mary s. 3 c. 1" because it was the first act passed in the third session of the parliament begun in the first year of the reign of Queen Mary, and the Riot Act is cited as "1 Geo 1 Stat. 2. c. 5.", being the fifth act passed in the second parliament of the first year of the reign of George I.

Regnal years are calculated from the official date (year, month and day) of a monarch's accession. For example, King George III acceded on 25 October 1760. That marks the beginning of his first regnal year. His second regnal year starts on 25 October 1761, his third regnal year on 25 October 1762, and so on. When a monarch dies, abdicates or is deposed, the regnal year comes to an end (whether the full year has run its course or not).  A new regnal year begins from a new date, with a new monarch.

As different monarchs begin their reigns at different times, the exact month and day when a regnal year begins varies across reigns.  For example, Elizabeth I's regnal year starts on 17 November, James I's on 24 March, Charles I's on 27 March, and so on.

The regnal year is distinct from the official "legal year" – that is, the calendar used for legal, civic and ecclesiastical purposes. The legal year also did not always coincide with the start date for the historical year. Until the 13th century, the English legal year began at Christmas (25 December). From the 14th century until 1752, the legal year began on 25 March. It is only since 1752 that the legal year was re-set to coincide with the start of the historical calendar year (1 January) (see Calendar (New Style) Act 1750).

These date differences can also be confusing when sorting dates in old documents before 1753. For example, the reign of Charles I came to an end with his execution on 30 January 1649, but contemporary legal records such as the House of Commons Journals record this as 30 January 1648. To account for this complication, it is customary for historians referring to legal events between 1 January and 25 March to write the year down in "double-barreled" format (e.g. "30 January 1648–49", the former being the legal year, the latter the historical year).

The regnal years listed below are given in normal historical date (not legal year).  So a parliamentary statute that was passed on, say, 10 February 1585 (in normal calendar date) would be dated in the official record as 10 February 1584 (the legal year), and simultaneously said to have been passed in the 27th year of Elizabeth I (the regnal year that started on 17 November 1584).

The 1750 Act reforming the legal year also officially introduced to England the Gregorian calendar on Thursday 14 September 1752.  Up until then, England had been using the Julian calendar, which by that time was eleven days behind the calendar of most countries on the European Continent.  So events before 1752 in English records often differ from European records, and it is sometimes necessary to refer to both sets of dates using "Old Style" (Julian) and "New Style" (Gregorian) notation, e.g. William of Orange's armada landed in England on 5 November 1688 (OS) or 15 November 1688 (NS) (see Old Style and New Style dates). The dates in the table below follow the English calendar (OS until 1752, NS thereafter).

The following table gives the dates of the regnal years for Kings of England (and subsequently Great Britain), from 1066 to the present day.  These are official de jure dates, and may or may not coincide with whether a particular king had de facto power or not at that time.  For example, as the Commonwealth era was suppressed in the official record, the regnal years of Charles II are measured from 30 January 1649 (the day his father Charles I was executed); as a result, when Charles II actually became king, on 29 May 1660, he was already in his 12th regnal year. (For the de facto tabulation of English rulers, see any conventional list of English monarchs.)

Regnal calendar table 
To calculate the regnal year from a particular date, one subtracts the first regnal year from the calendar year in question. The year is not adjusted if the month and day falls before the regnal date, and if it falls on or after the regnal date, add one.  Finally – for the regnal year of William III after Mary's death (that is, from 28 December 1694 onwards) – one also adds 6.

 Example 1: 4 July 1776. This falls in the reign of George III, whose first regnal year is 1760; so 1776  1760  16th year of his reign (4 July is before 25 October).
 Example 2: 2 May 1662. This is in the reign of Charles II, whose first regnal year is 1649. So 1662  1649  13, add 1 because 2 May is after 30 January, so the date falls in the 14th regnal year of Charles II.
 Example 3: 31 December 1695. This falls in the reign of William III alone (after Mary's death), whose "first" regnal year is 1694; so 1695  1694  1, add 1 because 31 December is after 28 December, and also add 6 because the date is after Mary's death (on 27 December), so the date falls in the "8th" year of his reign.

See also 

 Citation of United Kingdom legislation
 Acts of Parliament Numbering and Citation Act 1962
 List of English monarchs
 List of British monarchs

Notes

References

Further reading

Calendars
King lists
British monarchy
Lists of British monarchs
Reigns